Stan Gerdes is an American politician. He is the member for the 17th district of the Texas House of Representatives.

Life and career 
Gerdes was a senior advisor for the United States Department of Energy, serving under Rick Perry.

In May 2021, Gerdes was elected to the Smithville City Council. In December 2021, he was a candidate in the Republican primary election for the 17th district of the Texas House of Representatives.

In May 2022, Gerdes defeated Paul Pape in the Republican primary election. In August 2022, he filed a lawsuit to remove Linda Curtis from the general election ballot. His lawsuit was rejected by a judge. In November 2022, he defeated Madeline Eden and Curtis in the general election, winning 64 percent of the votes. He succeeded John Cyrier. He assumes his office in 2023.

References 

Living people
Place of birth missing (living people)
Year of birth missing (living people)
Republican Party members of the Texas House of Representatives
21st-century American politicians